Javid Reece Swaby-Neavin (born 11 June 2001) is an English professional footballer who plays as a defender for Hyde United.

Career
Born in Stevenage, Swaby-Neavin has played for Oldham Athletic, Ashton United and Radcliffe.

He turned professional with Oldham in May 2019, having spent time on loan at Ashton United in January and February 2019. He moved on loan to Radcliffe in August 2019.

He was released by Oldham at the end of the 2019–20 season.

After spending the 2020–21 season with Radcliffe, on 19 August 2021, Swaby-Neavin joined National League side FC Halifax Town on a short-term deal. On 28 February 2022, he was sent out on loan to Northern Premier League Premier Division side Hyde United on a one-month loan deal, with the club hovering just above the relegation zone. In June 2022, Swaby-Neavin returned to Hyde United on a permanent basis.

References

2001 births
Living people
People from Stevenage
English footballers
Oldham Athletic A.F.C. players
Ashton United F.C. players
Radcliffe F.C. players
FC Halifax Town players
Hyde United F.C. players
English Football League players
Northern Premier League players
National League (English football) players
Association football defenders